Poor Lot Barrow Cemetery is an archaeological site, a group of Bronze Age round barrows, near the A35 road about  west of Winterbourne Abbas, in Dorset, England. It is an English Heritage site.

Description
Although the barrows are situated not on a ridge or hilltop, as is usually found, but on relatively low-lying ground, the site is near the head of a valley descending to the east. Most are south of the A35 road, with a few north of the road. They date from about 1500 BC.

There are 44 barrows. Half of these are bowl barrows; the rest include seven bell barrows, six disc barrows, five pond barrows and two bell-disc barrows. The barrows, individually or in groups, are separately listed as ancient monuments.

There is a minor plateau on the west of the site, from which all the barrows can be seen. These include two rough alignments of barrows south of the road, on the eastern edge of the plateau. The alignment nearer the road includes a large ditched bell barrow of diameter  and height ; adjacent to this on the west is a disc barrow of diameter . To the south-west is the second alignment, where there is a prominent bell barrow of diameter  and height .

Two pond barrows were excavated in 1952–1953; pits and flint paving were found, but no burials; little is now left of the excavated barrows.

References

Barrows in England
Scheduled monuments in Dorset
Archaeological sites in Dorset
English Heritage sites in Dorset